Cooinda Station is a pastoral lease that currently operates as a cattle station in Queensland.

The ephemeral Werna Creek runs through the property. The property is predominantly Mitchell and Flinders grass country.

Cooinda was acquired by Balgarnie and Martin at some time prior to 1896. At this time it was running sheep. Over 10,000 sheep were sold off from the property in 1897. In 1898 a bore was being sunk at the property to guarantee water for stock. Robert Edward Balgarnie still owned the property when he was married in 1906.

See also
List of ranches and stations

References

Stations (Australian agriculture)
Pastoral leases in Queensland
Central West Queensland